The short-tailed shrew tenrec (Microgale brevicaudata) is a species of mammal in the family Tenrecidae. It is endemic to Madagascar. Its natural habitats are subtropical and tropical dry and moist lowland forests.

References

Afrosoricida
Mammals of Madagascar
Mammals described in 1899
Taxonomy articles created by Polbot